Buddika Madushanka (born 3 October 1992) is a Sri Lankan cricketer. He made his Twenty20 debut for Sri Lanka Army Sports Club in the 2017–18 SLC Twenty20 Tournament on 24 February 2018. He made his List A debut for Sri Lanka Army Sports Club in the 2017–18 Premier Limited Overs Tournament on 12 March 2018. He made his first-class debut for Sri Lanka Army Sports Club in the 2018–19 Premier League Tournament on 7 December 2016.

References

External links
 

1992 births
Living people
Sri Lankan cricketers
Sri Lanka Army Sports Club cricketers